DNA2-like helicase is an enzyme that in humans is encoded by the DNA2 gene.  Dna2, a homolog of DNA2KL present in budding yeast, possesses both helicase and nuclease activity, with which it helps catalyze early steps in homologous recombination.

References

Further reading